The 2018 San Francisco Shock season was the first season of the San Francisco Shock's existence in the Overwatch League. The team finished with a regular season record of 17–23 placing them ninth overall. San Francisco did not qualify for any of the Stage Playoffs and did not qualify for the Season Playoffs.

Preceding offseason 
On September 28, 2017, NRG Esports announced its official inaugural roster consisting of the following eight players:
Daniel "dhaK" Martinez Paz
Dante "Danteh" Cruz
André "iddqd" Dahlström
Matthew "super" DeLisi
Andrej "babybay" Francisty
Nikola "sleepy" Andrews
David "Nomy" Lizarraga Ramirez Osmar
Jay "sinatraa" Won
On the same day, the team announced the hiring of head coach Bradford Rajani. On October 30, Shock signed flex player Andreas "Nevix" Karlsson.

Review 
San Francisco Shocks first regular season OWL match was a 0–4 loss against the Los Angeles Valiant on January 10, 2018. The team's first victory came two days later in a 3–1 win over the Shanghai Dragons. The Shock did not find much success in the 2018 Overwatch League season; they finished with a 17–23 record and placed 9th of 12th in the overall league standings.

Final roster

Transactions 
Transactions of/for players on the roster during the 2018 regular season:
On March 13, Shock signed Park "Architect" Min-ho and Grant "Moth" Espe.
On April 5, Shock signed Choi "Choihyobin" Hyo-bin.

Standings

Record by stage

League

Game log

Preseason

Regular season

References 

2018 Overwatch League seasons by team
San Francisco Shock
San Francisco Shock seasons